The Guns of Navarone is a 1961 adventure war film directed by J. Lee Thompson from a screenplay by Carl Foreman, based on Alistair MacLean's 1957 novel of the same name. Foreman also produced the film. The film stars Gregory Peck, David Niven and Anthony Quinn, along with Stanley Baker, Anthony Quayle, Irene Papas, Gia Scala, James Darren and Richard Harris. The book and the film share a plot: the efforts of an Allied commando unit to destroy a seemingly impregnable German fortress that threatens Allied naval ships in the Aegean Sea.

Plot

In 1943, the Axis powers plan an assault on the island of Leros, where 2,000 British soldiers are marooned, to display their military strength and convince neutral Turkey to join them. Rescue by the Royal Navy is prevented by two massive radar-directed large-calibre guns on (fictional) nearby Navarone Island. When aerial bombing efforts fail, Allied Intelligence gathers a commando unit to infiltrate Navarone and destroy the guns. Led by Major Roy Franklin, the team is composed of Captain Keith Mallory, a renowned spy and an officer with the Long Range Desert Group (LRDG); Colonel Andrea Stavros from the Greek Army; Franklin's best friend Corporal Miller, an explosives expert and former chemistry teacher; Greco-American Spyros Pappadimos, a native of Navarone; and "The Butcher of Barcelona" Brown, an engineer and expert knife fighter.

Disguised as Greek fishermen on a decrepit fishing vessel, they sail across the Aegean Sea, where they successfully overwhelm the crew of a German patrol boat intercepting them. Later in the voyage, Mallory confides to Franklin that Stavros had sworn to kill him after the war because Mallory was inadvertently responsible for the deaths of Stavros's wife and children. After being shipwrecked on the coast of Navarone during a storm, the experienced mountaineer Mallory leads the team in a climb up the cliff, during which Franklin badly injures his leg. While taking shelter in the mountains, Mallory stops Franklin from killing himself and lies to him that their mission is only a diversion and that a major naval attack will be mounted on the coast instead. They rendezvous with two local resistance fighters, Spyros' sister Maria and her friend Anna, who was once captured and tortured by the Germans before escaping.

German soldiers continually dog the mission. The group is eventually captured in the town of Mandrakos by Oberleutnant Muesel while trying to find a doctor for Franklin (whose leg is infected with gangrene). While being interrogated by SS Hauptsturmführer Sessler, Stavros distracts the Germans and the team overpower their captors. They escape in German uniforms, leaving Franklin behind to receive medical attention. In due course, Franklin is injected with scopolamine and gives up Mallory's misinformation, as Mallory had hoped. Most forces leave the fortress to counter the expected coastal attack. Upon infiltrating the village of Navarone, however, Miller discovers most of his explosives have been sabotaged and deduces that Anna is the culprit. She confesses that she did not escape but that the Germans recruited her as an informer in exchange for her release. Mallory reluctantly prepares to execute Anna to prevent detection, but Maria intervenes instead and shoots her dead.

The team splits up: Mallory and Miller go for the guns, Stavros and Spyros create distractions in town (assisted by local residents), and Maria and Brown steal a boat for their escape. Spyros dies in a stand-off with a German officer, and Brown is stabbed during the boat theft due to his reluctance to kill a guard. Meanwhile, Mallory and Miller infiltrate the gun emplacement but set off an alarm when they seal the doors behind them. Miller plants explosives on the guns and prepares a large booby trap below an ammunition hoist, with a trigger device set into the track of the hoist. The Germans eventually force entry into the gun emplacement and defuse the explosives planted on the guns; meanwhile, Mallory and Miller make their escape down the cliff and are picked up from the sea by the stolen boat. A wounded Stavros is also able to reach the sea and is helped aboard by Mallory, thus resolving the blood feud between them.

As the Allied destroyers trying to rescue the trapped British troops appear, the Germans open fire at them. When the hoist eventually reaches Miller's trigger, the hidden explosives set off the surrounding shells in a massive explosion, totally destroying the guns and the entire fortress. Mallory's team safely reaches the British convoy. However, Stavros shakes Mallory's hand and decides to return to Navarone with Maria, with whom he has fallen in love. Mallory and Miller, returning home, observe the aftermath of their success from a destroyer.

Cast

 Gregory Peck as Captain Keith Mallory
 David Niven as Cpl John Anthony Miller
 Anthony Quinn as Colonel Andrea Stavros
 Stanley Baker as CPO Butcher Brown
 Anthony Quayle as Major Roy Franklin
 James Darren as Spyros Pappadimos
 Irene Papas as Maria Pappadimos
 Gia Scala as Anna
 James Robertson Justice as Jensen (also opening narration)
 Richard Harris as Squadron Leader Barnsby
 Bryan Forbes as Cohn
 Allan Cuthbertson as Major Baker
 Michael Trubshawe as Weaver
 Percy Herbert as Grogan
 George Mikell as Sessler
 Walter Gotell as Muesel
 Tutte Lemkow as Nicolai
 Albert Lieven as Commandant
 Norman Wooland as Group Captain
 Cleo Scouloudi as Bride
 Nicholas Papakonstantinou as Patrol Boat Captain
 Christopher Rhodes as German Gunnery Officer

Peter Grant, who had a brief (three films) career as an uncredited extra before becoming music manager of such popular British bands as the Yardbirds, Led Zeppelin and Bad Company, played an uncredited British commando.

Production
The film was part of a cycle of big-budget World War II adventures that included The Bridge on the River Kwai (1957), The Longest Day (1962) and The Great Escape (1963). MacLean's novel had been a bestseller and was read by Mike Frankovich, head of Columbia Pictures, who became excited as to its cinematic possibilities. He showed it to Carl Foreman, who had written Bridge on the River Kwai and had a producing deal with Columbia, who was not as enthusiastic at first, in part because he knew how difficult making a movie version would be. Foreman eventually changed his mind and agreed to make the movie. The screenplay, adapted by producer Carl Foreman, made significant changes from the novel; these included changing the gender of the local resistance fighters and inventing a conflict between Mallory and Andrea.

Foreman wanted to direct as well, but Columbia refused, insisting on a British director. The job went to Alexander Mackendrick (director of The Sweet Smell of Success), who said he "wanted to take what was essentially a typical, action-packed wartime melodrama and give it some pretentious overtones." Mackendrick was fired by Carl Foreman a week before shooting started due to "creative differences". He was replaced by J. Lee Thompson, in part because star Gregory Peck was impressed by North West Frontier. The role played by Niven was originally intended for Kenneth More. Foreman had written the part for More, but the head of Rank, John Davis, refused to lend More out for the film.

Shooting
The Greek island of Rhodes provided locations—the unit was based on there from April to July 1960. Quinn was so taken with the area that he bought land there in an area still called Anthony Quinn Bay. Some further scenes were shot on the islands of Gozo, near Malta, and Tino, in the Ligurian Sea. One of the warships in the film, the destroyer escort , then a training ship in the Hellenic Navy known as Aetos (D-01), is preserved as a museum ship in Albany, New York.

As described by director Thompson in the DVD commentary track, David Niven became severely ill after shooting sequences in a dirty pool of water underneath the cave elevator and could have died from a serious infection, remaining in the hospital for some weeks as the crew completed other portions of the cave sequence. Since key scenes with Niven remained incomplete, and it was doubtful whether he would return to finish the film, the entire production was in jeopardy. Reshooting key scenes throughout the film with another actor and abandoning the project to collect the insurance were contemplated. Against medical advice, Niven felt obligated to complete his work and agreed to shoot and complete his scenes. However, he relapsed and did not recover for another seven weeks.

A complication arose when it was found that Gregory Peck, whose character was supposed to be fluent in German, could not speak the language convincingly. Voice actor Robert Rietty dubbed all of Peck's German dialogue for the film. The film's maps were created by Halas and Batchelor, a British team best known for their animated films. Although the island of Navarone is fictional, a map depicted in the film purporting to show the island of Navarone shows it as the real island of Antikythera. Several members of the Greek royal family visited the set the day the Mandrakos cafe scene was filmed and appear in the background as extras.

Soundtrack
The film's score was composed by Dimitri Tiomkin and featured arrangements of several traditional songs.
 "The Guns of Navarone" (music by Dimitri Tiomkin, lyrics by Paul Francis Webster)
 "Karagouna" (traditional, arranged by Andreas Markides)
 "Ena Karavi Apo Ti Chio" (traditional, arranged by Andreas Markides)
 "Yalo Yalo" (traditional, arranged by Andreas Markides)
 "Treu Sein" (music by Dimitri Tiomkin, lyrics by Alfred Perry)
 "Das Sundenlied" (music by Dimitri Tiomkin, lyrics by Alfred Perry)

Tiomkin's theme song featured on the soundtrack album with lyrics recounting the film's plot. His theme became a popular instrumental with several cover versions including a 1965 version by The Skatalites. Other cover versions were performed by Johnny Griffin, Al Caiola and the Hollyridge Strings.

Release and reception

Box office
The Guns of Navarone had its Royal World Premiere in aid of the Edwina Mountbatten Trust and in the presence of Her Majesty Queen Elizabeth II and His Royal Highness Prince Philip, Duke of Edinburgh on 27 April 1961, at the Odeon Leicester Square in London's West End. The film grossed $28.9 million at the box office generating theatrical rentals of $13 million in the United States and Canada and was the second top-grossing film of 1961. It earned worldwide rentals of $25 million.

Critics
Reviews were mostly positive; Bosley Crowther of The New York Times called the film "one of those muscle-loaded pictures in the thundering tradition of DeMille, which means more emphasis is placed on melodrama than on character or credibility." He added that while the film was predictable, "for anyone given to letting himself be entertained by scenes of explosive action and individual heroic displays, there should be entertainment in this picture, for there is plenty of all that in it." Variety wrote that the film was "the sort of spectacular drama that can ignore any TV competition and, even with its flaws, should have patrons firmly riveted throughout its lengthy narrative. With a bunch of weighty stars, terrific special effects, several socko situations plus good camerawork and other technical okays, Foreman and director J. Lee Thompson have sired a winner." Harrison's Reports gave a grade of "Excellent," stating: "The script, direction, acting (by a brilliant cast) and photography are all prizeworthy." Richard L. Coe of The Washington Post called the film "a magnificently detailed cliff-hanger of spectacular settings and deeds of impossible derring-do ... What makes this one of the good ones is superlative photography of the storied Grecian isles, a crackerjack cast and a yarn about WWII in which unlikely incident succeeds unlikely incident with rare largesse."

John L. Scott of the Los Angeles Times called it "the best adventure movie to hit the screen this year," adding, "Some viewers will deplore a lack of character motivation—the origins of the six heroes are passed by rather quickly at the beginning—and women may yearn for more romantic passages in the film—but most of us, I am sure, will be satisfied with the epic suspense and sweep of this highly pictorial adventure." Brendan Gill of The New Yorker called it one of those movies "that are no less thrilling because they are so preposterous ... Let me also confess that I was held more or less spellbound all the way through this many-colored rubbish". The Monthly Film Bulletin thought the film fell well short of its ambitions, finding that Foreman's script had "too much diffusion, too much talk, and too many themes raised and dropped, so that the adventure story is not lifted to another plane but overstretched, robbed of the tight narrative concentration needed for a mounting tension." The review also criticized director Thompson for lacking "the ability of the Hollywood veterans to hold a long picture together" and instead of moving the action forward "in a series of jerks." , the film held a 92% rating on the review-aggregation website Rotten Tomatoes based on 24 reviews, with an average score of 7.93 out of 10.

Awards and honours

The film is recognized by the American Film Institute in the following list:
 AFI's 100 Years...100 Thrills—#89

Sequel
In 1968, author Alistair MacLean reunited Mallory, Miller, and Stavros in the best-selling novel Force 10 From Navarone, the only sequel of his long writing career. That was in turn filmed as the significantly different Force 10 from Navarone in 1978 by British director Guy Hamilton, a veteran of several James Bond films. The cast included Robert Shaw, Harrison Ford and Edward Fox. Though the sequel was a modest success, it did not match the original critically or commercially.

In popular culture
 The 1981 video game Castle Wolfenstein was inspired by the film
 On The Dick Van Dyke Show, in the episode "You're Under Arrest", Rob Petrie (Dick Van Dyke) claims to have fallen asleep while watching the film at a drive-in theater, an alibi of which the police are skeptical. In the episode "Bupkis", Petrie sings a song that he has written for The Alan Brady Show (the show-within-a-show in the series) titled "The Guns of Navarone" to an old army buddy
 In the Wu-Tang Forever double album, Method Man cites The Guns of Navarone in the track "Triumph"
 In Pulp Fiction, Jules Winnfield, played by Samuel L. Jackson, says to John Travolta's Vincent Vega: "Every time my fingers touch brain, I'm Superfly TNT. I'm The Guns of the Navarone."

References

External links

 
 
 
 
 
 The Guns of Navarone at TV Guide (heavily cut and revised version of 1987 write-up originally published in The Motion Picture Guide)

1961 films
1961 war films
1960s war adventure films
1960s English-language films
Best Drama Picture Golden Globe winners
British war adventure films
Columbia Pictures films
Films scored by Dimitri Tiomkin
Films based on British novels
Films based on military novels
Films based on works by Alistair MacLean
Films directed by J. Lee Thompson
Films set in 1943
Films shot in Corse-du-Sud
Films that won the Best Visual Effects Academy Award
Films with screenplays by Carl Foreman
Films set in Axis-occupied Greece
Films set on fictional islands
Films shot in Rhodes
Films shot at Associated British Studios
Films shot at Shepperton Studios
World War II films based on actual events
Films about the British Army